The Baden Class I e  locomotives with the Grand Duchy of Baden State Railways were twin-axled tank engines that were built by the Maschinenbaugesellschaft Karlsruhe for duties on branch lines. 

Of the total of 30 engines, 25 were taken over by the Deutsche Reichsbahn and, together with the Baden I b grouped into DRG Class 88.75 in the DRG renumbering plan for steam locomotives.

See also
Grand Duchy of Baden State Railway
List of Baden locomotives and railbuses

References 

 
 
  
 

0-4-0T locomotives
01 e
Railway locomotives introduced in 1887
B n2t locomotives
Maschinenbau-Gesellschaft Karlsruhe locomotives
Standard gauge locomotives of Germany

Freight locomotives